Panagiotis Pikrammenos (born 1945) is a Greek judge and politician who since 9 July 2019 serves as the Deputy Prime Minister of Greece. 

He briefly served as the caretaker Prime Minister of Greece from May 16, 2012 to June 20, 2012 after the legislative election in May 2012 resulted in an absence of majority.

Early life
Pikrammenos was born in Athens and is the son of Othon (Otto) Pikrammenos, a native of Patras and owner of the company "Hellenic and Foreign Press Union". Pikrammenos' paternal grandfather was Takis Pikrammenos, founder of the company, while his mother's side descends from the old Chaireti family.

Pikrammenos graduated from the German School of Athens in 1963 and from the Law School at Athens' Kapodistrian University in 1968. He did postgraduate studies at Panthéon-Assas University, and worked as a lawyer in Athens and London until becoming a rapporteur of the Council of State in 1976. He rose steadily through the ranks on the Council until he was appointed as its President in 2009. He also served as general manager of the National School of Judges from 2005 to 2009. As well as his service in the judiciary, Pikrammenos has worked on a number of legislative committees for the Ministry of Justice and from 1991 to 1993 he was a special advisor on judicial affairs to Prime Minister Konstantinos Mitsotakis. Shortly after he was appointed as President of the Council of State in 2009, an explosive device was placed on Pikrammenos' car by what police believed to be an anarchist group.

As a judge he has issued important decisions. He ruled it was unconstitutional to imprison for debt in 2003. He has also ruled in cases involving the Acropolis Museum and the AEK (sports club).

Personal life
Panagiotis Pikramenos' father, Othonas Pikramenos was collaborator of the Nazis during the German and Italian occupation of Greece. Specifically, Pikramenos was the distributor of the occupier, Nazi and Fascist propaganda press in Athens.

Acting Prime Minister of Greece

Pikrammenos served as president of Greece's Council of State, and was due to retire in 2012. He was appointed caretaker prime minister by President Karolos Papoulias on 16 May 2012, following the failure to form a government after the 6 May general elections. He led a government of technocrats in the run-up of the 17 June elections.

References

External links
Ποιος είναι ο Παναγιώτης Πικραμμένος, ο νέος υπηρεσιακός πρωθυπουργός - Biographical detail (Greek)

|-

|-

1945 births
21st-century prime ministers of Greece
Deputy Prime Ministers of Greece
Greek government-debt crisis
20th-century Greek judges
Greek MPs 2019–2023
Living people
National and Kapodistrian University of Athens alumni
New Democracy (Greece) politicians
Paris 2 Panthéon-Assas University alumni
Presidents of the Council of State (Greece)
21st-century Greek judges
Politicians from Athens